25 Kille is a 2016 Punjabi drama film directed by Simranjit Singh Hundal and starring Guggu Gill, Yograj Singh, Ranjha Vikram Singh, Jimmy Sharma, Lakha Lakhwinder Singh, Sonia Mann, and Sapna Bassi.

Set for release on 25 August 2016, the film follows four Jatt brothers and their love and unity against the odds of mystery.

Plot
The lives of four brothers change when they receive a letter from a chacha stating that they own an ancestral land of 25 kille which can be their own if they claim it. The land is in possession of Bachittar Singh and Santokh Singh, two brothers who are influential and ruthless feudal lords. How they get the land facing these two feudal lords and what they discover in the process forms the story.

Cast
 Guggu Gill as Saudagar Singh 
 Yograj Singh as Bachittar Singh Randhawa
 Lakha Lakhwinder Singh as Bhola
 Jimmy Sharma as Diljaan
 Ranjha Vikram Singh as Ransher/Gajjan Singh (Double role)
 Sonia Mann as Sonia
 Sapna Bassi as Sherry 
 Hobby Dhaliwal as Santokh Singh Randhawa 
 Prince Kj Singh as Bhinda
 Sardar Sohi as Kartar Singh Patwari 
 Daljinder Basran as Sethi Advocate 
 Sandeep Malhi as Advocate Navreet Kaur Dhillon   
 Gurpreet Bhangu as Saudagar's Bhua (Village woman)
 Baljit Sidhu as Jung Randhawa 
 Narinder Nina as Bachittar's father
 Rose J Kaur as Woman at Teeyan
 Aman Kotish
 Davinder Virk
 Sandeep Kaur Sandy as Bhabi
 Rajneet Kaur
 Sandeep Pateela 
 Dilawar Sidhu

Soundtrack
The Music Was Composed By Jaidev Kumar and Released by Saga Music.

References

External links 
 Facebook Page 
 Twitter 
 

2016 films
Indian drama films
Punjabi-language Indian films
2010s Punjabi-language films
2016 drama films